Bimantis is a genus of praying mantises in the family Gonypetidae. It is monotypic, being represented by the single species Bimantis malaccana. Bimantis malaccana was originally described in 1904 as belonging to the genus Ameles and is found in Asia.

References

Mantodea genera